The Cooperative was an informal group of famous French academics organized in 1907 to teach their children at a higher level than was available in Paris at the time. The group started when Marie and Pierre Curie noticed the strong mathematical potential of their daughter, Irène. Unable to find a school that could meet her needs, they joined forces with several other parents with strong academic backgrounds including Paul Langevin and Jean Perrin, and decided to take turns teaching one another's children.

The curriculum of The Cooperative was varied and included not only the principles of science and scientific research but such diverse subjects as Chinese and sculpture, with great emphasis placed on self-expression and play.

Notable results 
Irène Curie won the Nobel prize for chemistry in 1935.

References

French academics
Homeschooling
Organizations established in 1907
1907 establishments in France